Federico Darío Navarro (born 9 March 2000) is an Argentine professional footballer who plays as a defensive midfielder for Major League Soccer club Chicago Fire.

Club career

Talleres
Navarro was born in Frontera began his career with local side Deportivo Sebastian before joining the academy at Talleres in 2013. He went through the ranks at the club and in 2018 was promoted to the reserves. Prior to the 2018–19 season, Navarro was promoted to the first team by coach Juan Pablo Vojvoda. He made his professional debut for the club on 9 February 2019 in their 0–0 draw against Atlético Tucumán.

On 22 April 2021, Navarro made his Copa Sudamericana debut for Talleres in their 2–1 defeat against Emelec.

Chicago Fire
On 6 August 2021, it was announced that Navarro had signed with Major League Soccer club Chicago Fire for an undisclosed fee, with his contract lasting until 2025 and an option for the 2026 season. According to Talleres, the deal could go up to $5 million, with performance-related incentives.

International career
Navarro has represented Argentina at the under-19 level. He was part of the squad which participated in the South American Games in 2018.

Career statistics

References

External links
 Profile at Chicago Fire

2000 births
Living people
People from Castellanos Department
Argentine footballers
Association football midfielders
Talleres de Córdoba footballers
Chicago Fire FC players
Argentine Primera División players
Major League Soccer players
Argentina youth international footballers
Argentina under-20 international footballers
Argentine expatriate footballers
Argentine expatriate sportspeople in the United States
Expatriate soccer players in the United States
Sportspeople from Santa Fe Province